John Birmingham's Axis of Time trilogy features several major characters and many minor characters.

Admiral Phillip Kolhammer USN
Born in 1969, Admiral Kolhammer served in the First Gulf War and is the Commander of UNPROFLEET. He is an American of German extraction and Jewish ethnicity. By the Transition Act 1942, Admiral Kolhammer is the Commandant of the 'Zone

Brigadier Michael Barnes
Head of the Australian Contingent and Commanding Officer of the Second Cavalry, and the highest-ranked Army officer mentioned so far, Brigadier Barnes' billet was possibly the overall command of UNPROFLEET's Land Forces.

Brigadier Barnes was named after a long-time friend of Birmingham

Captain Karen Halabi RN
Karen Halabi is the CO of HMS Trident, Deputy Commander of UNPROFLEET and Head of the British Contingent. She is the daughter of a Pakistani father and a British mother. She joined the navy to escape from her abusive father. She is a strong-minded and skilled commander. During the events of the books, her mixed heritage and female gender cause problems with several people in the British high command who see her as unfit to command; however she gains the support of Winston Churchill and the British Royal Family.

General J. "Lonesome" Jones, USMC
CO of the 82nd Marine Expeditionary Brigade, Jones is a recipient of the Medal of Honor for rescuing the crew of an incapacitated M1A2 Abrams tank. He was married to a Frenchwoman who worked for Médecins Sans Frontières named Monique Danton. Her brother was a seaman assigned to the Robert Dessaix, and after it joined the German side, there was a backlash against Jones.

Captain Mike Judge USN
Executive Officer and later Captain of the USS Hillary Clinton, the Texan's next assignment is to take over production of fighter planes in The Zone.
After the Clinton's refit, Captain Judge was once again her Captain as she sailed into harm's way. During the interval between Designated Targets and Final Impact, Judge married the British Captain Karen Halabi.

Captain Jane Willet RAN
Captain Willet is the commander of HMAS Havoc, the only submarine to come through with the fleet. She is known to have had a younger sister who was executed by Islamic Extremists in Indonesia whilst doing relief work.

Prince Henry
Colonel Prince Henry Charles Albert David "Harry" Windsor is an officer of the British 22nd SAS Regiment and also is third in line to the throne, behind his older brother, King William V and William's two unnamed children (presumably Prince George and Princess Charlotte). After returning to the regiment "at the reduced rank of Captain", Prince Harry is billeted to HMAS Havoc, where he is captured by the Transition. He has the least bumpy switch of the Multinational Taskforce, due to being a royal. Additionally, he was placed on the Civil List as soon as his identity comes to light. He used that money to fund a tab at the local pub near his Regimental HQ for his officers and men who could run there and back under a certain time.

Other characters

21st Century Personnel

Multinational Force
Major Margorie Francois USMC - United States Marine Corps
Captain Colin Steele USN — Captain, JDS Siranui
Colonel Michael Toohey — Australian 2nd Cavalry Regiment
Lt Colonel Nancy Viviani USMC — Production Chief to Admiral Kolhammer
Captain Maria O'Brien USMC, retired
Lt Commander James McTeale RN — Executive Officer HMS Trident
Lieutenant Willy Liao USN — Yeoman to Admiral Kolhammer
Sergeant-Major Vivian St Clair — Regimental Sergeant-Major 22nd Regiment, British Army
Sergeant-Major Aubrey Harrison — Sergeant Major, 82nd MEU
Chief Petty Officer Vincente Rogas — US Navy SEALs
Chief Petty Officer Roy Flemming RAN — CPO HMAS Havoc
Admiral Tony Kevin - Commander-in-Chief, United States Pacific Command
Sub-Lieutenant Phillipe Danton - Ranking Officer on Robert Dessaix
Lt Commander Conrad Gray RAN - Executive Officer, HMAS Havoc
Major Pavel Ivanov - Russian Federation Spetsnaz. On secondment to US Navy SEALS
Lieutenant Amanda Lohrey RAN - Intelligence Officer, HMAS Havoc

Civilians
Julia Duffy - Feature Writer, The New York Times embedded with the 82nd MEU
Rosanna Natoli - CNN Producer

Contemporary Personnel

Allied Powers
General Henry Arnold US Army- Commander, US Army Air Corps
Winston Churchill - British Prime Minister
John Curtin - Australian Prime Minister
Brigadier General US Army Dwight Eisenhower - Commander-in-Chief, US Forces in the European Theater
Admiral Ernest King USN - Chief of Naval Operations
General Douglas MacArthur US Army - Supreme Allied Commander, Southwest Pacific Area
General George Marshall US Army - Chairman, Joint Chiefs of Staff
Admiral Chester Nimitz USN - Commander-in-Chief US Pacific Command, Commander-in-Chief, US Pacific Fleet
President Franklin Roosevelt - 32nd President of the United States
Rear Admiral Ray Spruance USN - Commander, Combined Pacific Task Force
Rear Admiral Sir Leslie Murray RN - Royal Navy Liaison to the US Pacific Fleet
General Leslie Groves - Director, Manhattan Project
Lieutenant John F Kennedy USN - Commander, PT101
Leading Seaman Michael 'Moose' Molloy - PT101
Sub-Lieutenant Philip Mountbatten RN - HMS Javelin
Lieutenant Jens Poulsson - Norwegian Commando
Commander Daniel Black USN (Contemporary) — Chiefs of Staff Liaison to Admiral Kolhammer
Chief Petty Officer Dave Rollins USN - CPO, PT101
Lieutenant George Ross USN - Commander, PT 59
Sergeant Arthur Snider USMC - 1st Marine Division
Squadron Leader Jan Zumbach RAF - 303 Squadron
Henry Stimson - Secretary of War
Lieutenant Wally Curtis USN - Training Publications Officer, Liaison Division, Us Navy

The Axis
Reichsmarschall Hermann Göring - Commander, Luftwaffe
Reichsführer SS Heinrich Himmler - Commander, SS, Later Führer of the Third Reich
Reichschancellor Adolf Hitler
Albert Speer - German Minister of Armaments
Standartenführer Otto Skorzeny — Personal Bodyguard to Adolf Hitler
General Kurt Zeitzler - Wehrmacht Chief of Staff
Major-General Paul Brasch - Deputy Minister, Reichministery of Armaments
Commander Jisaku Hidaka IJN - Interim Military Governor of Hawaii
General Masaharu Homma - Commander, Japanese Land Forces in Australia
General Hiroshi Oskima - Japanese Ambassador to Germany
Lieutenant Masahisa Uemura - Commander, Special Attack Squadron, Sapporo
Grand Admiral Isoroku Yamamoto IJN - Commander, Japanese Combined Fleet

Union of Soviet Socialist Republics
Lavrenty Pavlovich Beria - Director, NKVD
Nikita Sergeyevich Khrushchev - Prisoner
Joseph Stalin - General Secretary of the Communist Party of the Soviet Union
Vyacheslav Molotov - Foreign Minister

Civilians
Graeme Blundell - Chief of Staff, New York Times
Detective Sergeant Lou 'Buster' Cherry - Homicide Squad, Honolulu PD
Dr Michael Cooper MD - Doctor in Bundaberg, Queensland
James 'Slim Jim' Davidson - CEO and Principal Shareholder, Slim Jim Enterprises. Formerly, Able Seaman, USS Astoria
Colonel William Joseph Donovan - Director, Office of Strategic Services
Lord Halifax - British Ambassador to the United States
J Edgar Hoover - Director, Federal Bureau of Investigation
Special Agent Dave Hurly - Federal Bureau of Investigation
Paul Robertson - Principal Private Secretary to John Curtin
William Stephenson - Winston Churchill's personal representative in the United States
Mitch Taverner - Office of Strategic Services
Clyde Toland - Assistant Director, Federal Bureau of Investigation

Alternate history characters
Characters
Axis of Time